Enwer Memet-Eli (born 10 September 1997) is a Chinese footballer who plays for Cangzhou Mighty Lions.

Club career
Enwer joined Chinese Super League newcomer Guizhou Hengfeng in 2017. On 4 March 2018, he made his debut for the club in a 3–1 home defeat against Jiangsu Suning, coming on as a substitute for Liang Xueming in the 62nd minute.

Career statistics 
.

References

External links
 

1997 births
Living people
Chinese footballers
Uyghur sportspeople
Chinese people of Uyghur descent
Footballers from Xinjiang
Association football forwards
Guizhou F.C. players
Chinese Super League players
China League One players